Charles Herlofson (15 June 1891 – 9 November 1968) was a Norwegian footballer.

He was born in Kristiania. He played for the club Mercantile, and also for the Norwegian national team. He competed at the 1912 Summer Olympics in Stockholm. He was a brother of rower Harald Herlofson and the father of naval officer Charles Oluf Herlofson.

References

External links

1891 births
1968 deaths
Footballers from Oslo
Norwegian footballers
Norway international footballers
Footballers at the 1912 Summer Olympics
Olympic footballers of Norway
Association football midfielders